Lopcha is a rural locality (a settlement) in Lopchinsky Selsoviet of Tyndinsky District, Amur Oblast, Russia. The population was 401 as of 2018. There are 6 streets.

Geography 
Lopcha is located 186 km northwest of Tynda (the district's administrative centre) by road. Larba is the nearest rural locality.

References 

Rural localities in Tyndinsky District